František Šmahel (born 17 August 1934 in Trhová Kamenice) is a Czech historian of medieval political and intellectual history, known for his works about Hussitism, universities in the Middle Ages, humanism, and Monarch representation in the Middle Ages. He is a globally-recognized expert on the Bohemian Reformation and the medieval Prague University. His scholarly activities are
diverse, covering historical figures (Jan Hus, Jerome of Prague), university texts, political history, research into rituals, and the publication of source editions. 

After the Velvet Revolution in 1989, Šmahel was head of the Historical Institute of the Czech Academy of Sciences for eight years. Together with Petr Sommer, he initiated the foundation of the Centre for Medieval Studies in Prague and he became its first director in 1998–2004. In 1996, Šmahel was awarded the Hans Sigrist Prize. František Šmahel is a member of many prestigious scholarly associations and is the recipient of a number of foreign and Czech honours, including the Česká hlava National Prize for Science (2013).

References

External links 

 
 Works in Bibliography of the Czech Lands History (Historical Institute, Czech Academy of Sciences)

1934 births
Living people
20th-century Czech historians
Recipients of Medal of Merit (Czech Republic)
People from Chrudim District
Corresponding Fellows of the Medieval Academy of America
Czech medievalists
Charles University alumni
Academic staff of Charles University
21st-century Czech historians